Strigosella is a genus of flowering plants belonging to the family Brassicaceae.

Its native range is Mediterranean to China and Arabian Peninsula.

Species:
 Strigosella africana (L.) Botsch. 
 Strigosella behboudiana (Rech.f. & Esfand.) Botsch.

References

Brassicaceae
Brassicaceae genera